"Strange World" is a song by American singer Ké and the lead single from the debut album I am [  ]. It was produced by Rick Neigher and Ké and written by Ké and Michael Prendergast. The song was released in 1995 by RCA Records and became a smash hit in Europe that year, topping the airplay charts in countries such as Italy and Germany. A dance remix of the track by Junior Vasquez topped the Billboard Dance/Club Play chart in 1996. The single sold around 3 million copies worldwide. Finnish band HIM released a cover of the song for their 2012 compilation album XX - Two Decades of Love Metal. In 2016, Ké appeared on a version of "Strange World" by Italian band Matmata.

Track listings and formats
12" Vinyl single (RCA 74321 34941 1)
A1 – "Strange World (album version)" – 4:32
A2 – "Strange World (Junior's Sound Factory mix)" – 9:45
B1 – "Strange World (Tribalistic dub)" – 8:09
B2 – "Strange World (Junior's Strange mix edit)" – 11:27

12" Vinyl single (RCA RDAB-64371-1)
A1 – "Strange World (Junior's Sound Factory mix)" – 9:45
A2 – "Strange World (LP version)" – 4:32
B1 – "Strange World (Tribalistic mix)" – 8:10
B2 – "Strange World (Padapella)" – 6:07

12" Vinyl single (RCA KE 96)
A1 – "Strange World (LP version)" – 9:45
A2 – "Strange World (Junior's Sound Factory mix)" – 4:32
B1 – "Someday (LP version)" – 8:10
B2 – "Someday (alternate radio mix)" – 6:07
B3 – "Someday (Harder Dance mix)" – 6:07

 U.S. 12" Vinyl promo single (RCA RDJ 64494-2)
 "Strange World (edit)" – 4:01
 "Strange World (Chris Shaw edited mix)" – 3:53
 "Strange World (album version)" – 4:32

U.K. CD single (RCA 7863 64371 2)
 "Strange World (Junior's Sound Factory Mix)" – 9:45
 "Strange World (LP version)" – 4:32
 "Strange World (Tribalistic mix)" – 8:10
 "Strange World (Padapella)" – 6:07

U.K. CD single (RCA 74321 34941 2)
 "Strange World (radio edit)" – 3:53
 "Strange World (Padapella)" – 6:07
 "Strange World (Junior's Sound Factory mix)" – 9:45
 "All You Ever Wanted" – 4:27

Germany CD maxi-single (74321335582)
 "Strange World (short)" – 3:53
 "Strange World (long)" – 4:32
 "All You Ever Wanted" – 4:27

Charts

Cover by HIM

In 2012, the Finnish rock band HIM covered "Strange World" for their second compilation album, XX - Two Decades of Love Metal. It is the only previously unreleased track on the album. It was released as a single and has a music video.

References

HIM (Finnish band) songs
1995 songs